Fiddle is a 2010 Malayalam film directed by Prabhakaran Muthana starring Idea Star Singer fame Varun J. Thilak. It also has Jagathy Sreekumar, Ananya and Salim Kumar in pivotal roles.

Story 
Fiddle is about a group of youngsters who are also students of the Music College, form an organization called Satkala Sangham under the leadership of Sandeep. They move from village to village doing programmes and help the needy and the poor with the money that they earn. On one such journey they happen to camp at a hill station called Ponmudi, where Sandeep and his friends get caught up in the mysteries surrounding the life of a girl named Gayatri.

Cast 

'Fiddle' marks the acting debut of ISS fame Varun J. Thilak, and he has done a fair job in a low weight role that doesn't demand too much from his side. Ananya does the same as well, and never has to perform much either. Jagathy, Bindu Panicker and Jagadeesh also chip in their little bits, but to no avail. The same however couldn't be said of the performances of a couple of other new faces who have done significant roles in the film.

Cast 
 Varun J. Thilak as Sandeep
 Jagathy Sreekumar
 Ananya as Gayatri
 Salim Kumar
 Jagadish
 Santhakumari
 Lakshmi Priya

References

External links
 
 https://web.archive.org/web/20120609121254/http://popcorn.oneindia.in/title/1485/fiddle.html
 https://web.archive.org/web/20100903160748/http://www.cinecurry.com/movie/malayalam/fiddle

2010 films
2010s Malayalam-language films
2010s musical films